Leonardo da Vinci High School is a high school in the lower west side of Buffalo, New York. There are 400 students enrolled in da Vinci spanning grades 9–12. The high school building is located on the D'Youville College campus. The school located at 334 Porter Avenue and serves Grades 9 through 12. The current principal is Gregory Lodinsky.

History 
Leonardo da Vinci was originally housed on the 4th Floor of the Koessler Administration Building (KAB) on the D'Youville College Campus and shared space with the Grover Cleveland High School for electives. Currently, the school is housed solely in Madonna Hall building which is adjacent to KAB still on the D'Youville College campus. Students who attend DaVinci have the opportunity to take college credit-bearing classes from D'Youville.

Former principals 
Ronald J. Meer – 1987–1992
Benjamin L. Randle, Jr. – 1992–1998
Patricia A. Preston – 1998–2010
Michael J. O'Brien – 2010–2012
Florence S. Krieter – 2012–2016

Sports 
Leonardo da Vinci High School offers varsity sports including:

 Soccer
 Volleyball (Female only)
 Cross Country
 Swimming
 Bowling
 Basketball
 Softball/Baseball
 Track
 Tennis

Students who are interested in playing a sport da Vinci does not offer are able to try out at Hutchinson Central Technical High School.

Student statistics

Teacher statistics

Notable alumni
India Walton – American political activist, democratic socialist

External links

References

 NYSED, 2004-2005
 www.buffaloschools.org

1999 establishments in New York (state)
Educational institutions established in 1999
High schools in Buffalo, New York
Public high schools in New York (state)